Moatassem (also spelled Moatasem, Moatassam, Mutassim and Motasim) is a masculine Arabic given name, it may refer to:

 Mouatasem Alaya (born 1983), Syrian footballer
 A spelling variant of Mutassim Gaddafi (1977–2011), Libyan Army officer

Arabic masculine given names